Nothing but the Blues is the second album by jazz guitarist Herb Ellis. In the liner notes, Nat Hentoff calls it Ellis's “best album yet and one of the most directly fulfilling sessions” of 1958. In his review for DownBeat, John Tynan agreed: "One of the very best jazz albums this year. Don’t miss it.”

"The point at which blues becomes jazz is an elusive one," says Gregory Isola. "Those of you up for exploring this crucial crossroads ... can start right here."

Track listing

1994  CD reissue bonus tracks
The following tracks were recorded May 1, 1958 in Paris

Personnel
 Herb Ellis – guitar
 Roy Eldridge – trumpet, tracks 1–8, 11
 Dizzy Gillespie - trumpet, track 12
 Stan Getz – tenor saxophone
 Coleman Hawkins - tenor saxophone, track 10
 Ray Brown – double bass
 Stan Levey – drums, tracks 1-8
 Gus Johnson – drums, tracks 9-12
 Oscar Peterson - piano, tracks 9-12

References 

Herb Ellis albums
1958 albums